Events in the year 1688 in Norway.

Incumbents
Monarch: Christian V

Events
29 September -  The Norwegian Code enters into force.

Arts and literature

Births

Full date unknown

Deaths
6 December – Gert Miltzow, priest and historical writer (born 1629).

See also

References